Mammen Mathai was a member of the 9th, 10th, and 11th Kerala Legislative Assembly. He was from Kerala Congress (M) party and represented the Thiruvalla constituency.

Positions held
 Chairman, Committee of petitions, Kerala Legislative Assembly (2001-03)
 Senate member CUSAT
 President, Peringara Grama Panchayat

References

1951 births
2003 deaths
Thiruvalla
Kerala MLAs 1991–1996
Kerala MLAs 1996–2001
Kerala MLAs 2001–2006